Diamond in the Rough is the fourth studio album released by American country artist Jessi Colter. It was the second album issued by Colter in 1976; the previous was Jessi, released earlier in the year. Diamond in the Rough was issued under Capitol Records and was produced by Ken Mansfield.

Background
Diamond in the Rough was issued as Colter's second studio album in 1976, containing ten new tracks, which included a cover of The Beatles's "Hey Jude". The album only spawned one single released in 1977, titled "I Thought I Heard You Calling My Name", which peaked at #29 on the Hot Country Songs chart. The song's B-side, "You Hung the Moon (Didn't You Waylon)", was also released as a single, however it failed to chart. Diamond in the Rough peaked at #4 on the Top Country Albums chart (Colter's third album in a row to do so), while also reaching #79 on the Billboard 200 albums chart. The album was co-produced by Colter's husband, country music artist Waylon Jennings, who also produced her previous two albums.

Track listing
All tracks composed by Jessi Colter; except where indicated
"Diamond in the Rough" (Donnie Fritts, Spooner Oldham)
"Get Back" (John Lennon, Paul McCartney)
"Would You Leave Now"
"Hey Jude" (John Lennon, Paul McCartney)
"Oh Will (Who Made it Rain Last Night)"
"I Thought I Heard You Calling My Name" (Lee Emerson)
"Ain't No Way" (Tere Mansfield)
"You Hung the Moon (Didn't You Waylon)"
"Woman's Heart is a Handy Place to Be" (Cort Casady, Marshall Chapman)
"Oh Will"

Personnel
 Jessi Colter – lead vocals, keyboards
Richie Albright - drums
 Bill C. Graham – mandolin, violin
 Sherman Hayes – bass
 John Leslie Hug – guitar
 Waylon Jennings – backing vocals, guitar, producer
 Ken Mansfield – producer
 Todd Miller – horn
 Ralph Mooney – steel guitar
 Clifford "Barny" Robertson – backing vocals, keyboards
 Carter Robertson — backing vocals
 Don Robertson — keyboards
 Craig Ware — horn
 Robert Ware — horn

Chart positions
Album – Billboard (North America), RPM (Canada)

Singles - Billboard (United States), RPM (Canada)

References

1976 albums
Jessi Colter albums
albums produced by Waylon Jennings
Capitol Records albums